Wolbrom  is a town in Olkusz County, Lesser Poland Voivodeship, Poland, with 9,568 inhabitants (2005).

Wolbrom lies in the Kraków-Częstochowa Upland, which is also called the Polish Jura. South of the town there is Kamienna Mountain, with a steel cross on top, and a great view of Wolbrom. In 1885, Wolbrom received a rail station, along a newly built route from Dęblin to Dąbrowa Górnicza. The town is also located along the Broad Gauge Metallurgy Line.

History
The history of the town dates back to the year 1311, when King Władysław Łokietek gave permission to found a settlement called Wolwrami, located in a large forest on the border between Lesser Poland and Silesia. The founders of the settlement allegedly were brothers named Wolframi (germ: Wolfram) and Hilary from Kraków, and the village was named after one of them. Wolbrom received its Magdeburg rights town charter in 1327, lost it in 1869 and got it back in 1930.

In the Kingdom of Poland, Wolbrom was located in Kraków Voivodeship, along a busy merchant route from Lesser Poland to Silesia and Greater Poland. In 1400, King Władysław Jagiełło issued a bill, which ordered all merchants travelling from Kraków to Greater Poland to go through Wolbrom. The town had a parish church with a school and a hospital for the poor. Every Thursday it had a fair, whose tradition is kept until now. In 1485 most of the wooden buildings burned in a fire, after which King Kazimierz Jagiellończyk granted Wolbrom additional privileges. Wolbrom prospered, like the whole of Lesser Poland, until the mid-17th century. The town was almost completely destroyed by the Swedes in the deluge, furthermore, the ancient merchant route became obsolete and was not used any longer. In 1660, the town had only 85 buildings, with 500 inhabitants.

After the Partitions of Poland, Wolbrom belonged to Russian-controlled Congress Poland (since 1815). As a punishment for the January Uprising, the Russians stripped it of the town charter, and Wolbrom remained a village from 1869 to 1930. At the beginning of World War I it was captured by the Austrians, who, together with the Germans, ruled Wolbrom until November 1918. In the Second Polish Republic, Wolbrom belonged to Kielce Voivodeship, and even though it officially remained a village until 1930, it was bigger than Miechów or Olkusz. During World War II, almost all Jewish inhabitants of the town were murdered by the Germans in the Holocaust. German authorities opened a ghetto here in the autumn of 1941, with 8,000 crowded in it. In September 1942, Germans and Ukrainians murdered 600, mostly elderly Jews, and the remaining people were transported by train to Belzec death camp.

Like in other medieval towns in Europe, the center of Wolbrom is marked by a market square, with several 19th-century tenement houses, and an early 17th-century parish church.

Sport
 Przebój Wolbrom - football club

References

External links

On One Clear Day: The Story of Jewish Wolbrom an online exhibition by Yad Vashem
 Jewish Community in Wolbrom on Virtual Shtetl
 

Cities and towns in Lesser Poland Voivodeship
Olkusz County
Kraków Voivodeship (14th century – 1795)
Kielce Governorate
Kielce Voivodeship (1919–1939)
Holocaust locations in Poland